Albert Aubrey Hinchley (1869 – 1922) was an English footballer who played in the Football League for Aston Villa.

References

1869 births
1922 deaths
English footballers
Aston Villa F.C. players
English Football League players
Association football goalkeepers